Reignac may refer to:

Reignac, Charente, France
Reignac, Gironde, France